Arthur Cobley (5 October 1874 – 21 April 1960) was an English cricketer. Cobley was a right-handed batsman who bowled right-arm medium pace. He was born at Barwell, Leicestershire.

Cobley made his first-class debut for Leicestershire against Yorkshire in the 1897 County Championship at Headingley. He made two further appearances in that season's County Championship, against Surrey and Warwickshire, while the following season he made two appearances in that season's County Championship, against Essex and Warwickshire. His next appearance for Leicestershire came in the 1903 County Championship against Derbyshire, while in that same season he also made a further first-class appearance against the touring Gentlemen of Philadelphia. His final two first-class appearances for the county came in the 1904 County Championship against Lancashire and Nottinghamshire. He scored a total of 139 runs at an average of 7.72 from his nine matches, with a high score of 22.

He died at Evington, Leicestershire, on 21 April 1960.

References

External links
Arthur Cobley at ESPNcricinfo
Arthur Cobley at CricketArchive

1874 births
1960 deaths
People from Barwell
Cricketers from Leicestershire
English cricketers
Leicestershire cricketers